The Volcano and Ryūkyū Islands campaign was a series of battles and engagements between Allied forces and Imperial Japanese forces in the Pacific Ocean campaign of World War II between January and June 1945.

The campaign took place in the Volcano and Ryukyu island groups. The two main land battles in the campaign were the Battle of Iwo Jima (February 16-March 26, 1945) and the Battle of Okinawa (April 1–June 21, 1945). One major naval battle occurred, called Operation Ten-Go (April 7, 1945) after the operational title given to it by the Japanese.

The campaign was part of the Allied Japan campaign intended to provide staging areas for an invasion of Japan as well as supporting aerial bombardment and a naval blockade of the Japanese mainland. The dropping of atomic weapons on two Japanese cities and the Soviet invasion of Japanese Manchuria, however, caused the Japanese government to surrender without an armed invasion being necessary.

The campaign

Iwo Jima

Iwo Jima's strategic importance was debatable. The Allies considered the island to be an important staging area for future invasion forces, however, after the Allies captured Iwo Jima, their focus shifted from using the island as a staging area to employing the island as a base for fighter escorts and the B-29 Superfortress bombers recovery. The Japanese had a radar station and airstrips to launch fighters that would pick off B-29s raiding the Japanese home islands. If captured by the Americans, it could provide them with bases for fighter escorts to assist B-29s in raiding the Japanese home islands, as well as being an emergency landing strip for any damaged B-29s that could not return to the Marianas.

The operation to take Iwo Jima was authorized in October 1944. On February 19, 1945, the campaign for Iwo Jima was launched. The island was secure by March 26. Only a few Japanese were captured, as the rest were killed or committed suicide as defeat befell them. However, the Americans suffered a heavy toll in casualties in their initial landing, as opposed to the main fighting. Fighters began operations from March 11, when the airfields were secured, and the first bombers hit the home islands.

Okinawa

Okinawa was right at Japan's doorstep, providing the springboard for the Allies to invade the Japanese mainland. Meanwhile, on Okinawa 131,000 Japanese soldiers dug in away from the landing beaches in the southern half of the island, as opposed to attempting to stop the landing at the beaches in earlier battles. Gen. Mitsuru Ushijima made sure that the Americans would not even come close to the beaches, using kamikazes under Soemu Toyoda to stem the tide. The suicide bombers proved effective, sinking 34 ships and damaging hundreds of others, but they nevertheless failed to stop American reinforcements from arriving on the island. On April 7, the large Japanese battleship Yamato was sent out to use a kamikaze method, codenamed Ten-Go, but was sunk before it could attack the invasion fleet. Vice-Admiral Seiichi Ito and the commander of the battleship, Kosaku Aruga, were killed in the fatal mission, and the battleship was destroyed before it could engage the US navy. 

On the land campaign, 48,193 military personnel were killed, wounded, or missing in the campaign to secure the island. By the end of the battle, three-quarters of the Japanese officers were killed or had killed themselves. Only a handful of officers survived the battle, although more soldiers capitulated. Control of the Volcano and Ryukyu Islands helped the US Army Air Forces conduct missions against targets on Honshu and Kyushu, with the first raid occurring on Tokyo, from March 9–10.

The Air Campaign
After the capture of the Mariana Islands in 1944, U.S. land-based and carrier borne aircraft struck the Volcano and Bonin Islands. Haha-Jima and Chichi-Jima in the Bonin Islands and Iwo Jima in the Volcano Islands in particular were attacked by U.S. aircraft. 

Beginning in late 1944, the United States Navy’s and Royal Navy's carrier-based aircraft attacked Japanese military forces on the Ryukyu Islands. This included the islands of Amami, Tanega, Yaku, Kikai, Miyako, Tokuno, Ishigaki, and Daito islands which held Japanese military and civilian infrastructure that had to be neutralized for Allied troops operating around Okinawa. Kamikaze bases in the Ryukyu Islands posed a particular threat to the U.S. and British task force operating around Okinawa and its environs. Allied air attacks continued until August 1945. The aerial bombardment intensified further after the Invasion of Okinawa on 1 April 1945. Thousands of Japanese aircraft and dozens merchant ships were destroyed, with a consequent heavy loss of both civilian and military lives.

See also
 Japan campaign
 Japanese air attacks on the Mariana Islands

References

Further reading
 

Japan campaign
United States Marine Corps in World War II
Campaigns of World War II
Campaigns, operations and battles of World War II involving the United Kingdom